Mid and West Wales was a European Parliament constituency covering south western Wales.

Prior to its uniform adoption of proportional representation in 1999, the United Kingdom used first-past-the-post for the European elections in England, Scotland and Wales. The European Parliament constituencies used under that system were smaller than the later regional constituencies and only had one Member of the European Parliament each.

The seat became part of the much larger Wales constituency in 1999.

Boundaries
1979–1984: Brecon and Radnor; Cardigan; Carmarthen; Gower; Llanelli; Pembroke; Swansea East; Swansea West.

1984–1994: Brecon and Radnor; Carmarthen; Ceredigion and Pembroke North; Gower; Llanelli; Neath; Pembroke; Swansea East; Swansea West.

1994–1999: Brecon and Radnor; Carmarthen; Ceredigion and Pembroke North; Llanelli; Meirionnydd Nant Conwy; Montgomery; Pembroke.

Members of the European Parliament

Results

|- style="background-color:#F6F6F6"
! style="background-color: " |
| colspan="2"   | New creation:  win.
| align="right" | Swing
| align="right" | N/A
||

References

External links
 David Boothroyd's United Kingdom Election Results

European Parliament constituencies in Wales (1979–1999)
1979 establishments in Wales
1999 disestablishments in Wales
Constituencies established in 1979
Constituencies disestablished in 1999